Dickenson is a surname. Notable people with the surname include:

Anthony Dickenson (born 1952), British neuroscientist
Dave Dickenson (born 1973), Canadian football player
Donna Dickenson (born 1946), American philosopher and ethicist
Edith Dickenson (1851–1903), English-born Australian journalist and war correspondent
Ethel Dickenson (1880–1918), Canadian nurse
Haydn Dickenson (born 1961), classical pianist
Herb Dickenson (1931–2019), Canadian ice hockey player
Jean Dickenson, American former singer
Janie Dickenson, Australian politician
Jimmy Dickenson (1908–1982), English footballer
John Dickenson (disambiguation), multiple people
Lou Dickenson (born 1982), Canadian ice hockey player
Margaret Dickenson, Canadian cookbook author, columnist and television host
Mitchell Dickenson (born 1996), English footballer
Russell E. Dickenson (1923–2008), National Park Service director
Samuel Dickenson (1733–1823), English botanist
Vic Dickenson (1906–1984), American jazz trombonist

See also
Dickinson (name)
Dickenson (disambiguation)

English-language surnames
Surnames of English origin
Patronymic surnames
Surnames from given names